Damm is a surname. Notable people with the surname include:

Arvid Damm, artist
Jürgen Damm, Mexican professional footballer
Martin Damm (born 1972), Czech tennis player
Rodrigo Damm, Brazilian mixed martial artist
Tobias Damm (born 1983), German footballer
Ulrik Damm, Danish curler and coach